Curtitoma piltuniensis is a species of sea snail, a marine gastropod mollusk in the family Mangeliidae.

Description
The length of the shell attains 7.5 mm.

Distribution
This marine species occurs off Sakhalin, Eastern Russia.

References

 Bogdanov, I. P. "NEW SPECIES OF GASTROPODS OF THE GENUS OENOPOTA (GASTROPODA, TURRIDAE) FROM THE FAR-EAST SEAS OF THE USSR." ZOOLOGICHESKY ZHURNAL 64.3 (1985): 448–453.

External links
  Tucker, J.K. 2004 Catalog of recent and fossil turrids (Mollusca: Gastropoda). Zootaxa 682:1-1295.

piltuniensis
Gastropods described in 1985